Thomas Borge Lie (born 25 February 1985) is a Norwegian freestyle skier. He was born in Oslo. He competed at the 2014 Winter Olympics in Sochi, in ski-cross.

References

External links

1985 births
Living people
Skiers from Oslo
Freestyle skiers at the 2014 Winter Olympics
Norwegian male freestyle skiers
Olympic freestyle skiers of Norway